Lordi Daijagra  (Lordi Dejgara) is a panchayat village in Rajasthan, India.  Administratively, it is under Mandor Taluka, Jodhpur District of Rajasthan. Lordi Daijagra is 26 km by road west of the city of Jodhpur on National Highway 114.

There are three villages in the Lordi Daijagra gram panchayat: Lordi Daijagra, Karani and Lordi Doliya.

Demographics 
In the 2001 census, the village of Lordi Daijagra had 2,161 inhabitants, with 1,100 males (50.9%) and 1,061 females (49.1%), for a gender ratio of 965 females per thousand males.

Schools
 Satya Bharti School, primary school

References

Villages in Jodhpur district